Hichem Kaabeche (born 12 March 1990) is an Algerian handball player for JSE Skikda.

He competed for the Algerian national team at the 2015 World Men's Handball Championship in Qatar.

He also participated at the 2013 World Championships.

References

1990 births
Living people
Sportspeople from Skikda
Algerian male handball players
African Games bronze medalists for Algeria
African Games medalists in handball
Competitors at the 2011 All-Africa Games
21st-century Algerian people
Mediterranean Games competitors for Algeria
Competitors at the 2022 Mediterranean Games